The blackfin waryfish (Scopelosaurus lepidus) is a species of fish in the family Notosudidae (waryfish).

Description

The blackfin waryfish is pinkish black in colour, with the pectoral fins having a large black patch covering their basal two-thirds and a white distal stripe.

Habitat

The blackfin waryfish lives in the North Atlantic Ocean.

Behaviour

The young feeds on copepods while the adults feed on euphausiids, hyperiids and mesopelagic fish. Spawning occurs in midwater far offshore, including in the Sargasso Sea. It is eaten by Sebastes (ocean perch).

References

Notosudidae
Fish described in 1955
Taxa named by Gerard Krefft
Taxa named by Günther Maul